California's 40th district may refer to:

 California's 40th congressional district
 California's 40th State Assembly district
 California's 40th State Senate district